Stuff, stuffed, and stuffing may refer to:
Physical matter
General, unspecific things, or entities

Arts, media, and entertainment

Books
Stuff (1997), a novel by Joseph Connolly
Stuff (2005), a book by Jeremy Strong

Fictional character
A flying creature in the video game Kya: Dark Lineage

Film
The Stuff, a 1985 horror/comedy film by Larry Cohen
Stuff (film), a 1993 documentary about John Frusciante's life

Illustration
Henry Wright (1849–1937), worked for Vanity Fair under the pseudonym "Stuff"

Music
Stuff (Holly McNarland album), 1997
Stuff (band), a 1970s-1980s fusion/rhythm and blues music group
Stuff (Stuff album)
Stuff, a 1992 album by Bill Wyman
"Stuff" (song), a 2000 single by Diamond Rio from the album One More Day
Stuff (Eleanor McEvoy album), 2014
Stuffed (album), by Mother Goose

Television
"Stuff" (How I Met Your Mother), a 2007 episode from the sitcom How I Met Your Mother
Alexei Sayle's Stuff, a BBC comedy sketch series

Media
Stuff (magazine), a British consumer electronics magazine
Stuff (company), New Zealand media company (formerly Fairfax New Zealand)
Stuff (website), the titular news website of the company

Computing
Bit stuffing, the insertion of noninformation bits into computerized data
To compress files using StuffIt

Food and biology
Stuffing, edible mixture, used to fill a cavity in another food item or served as a side dish
An animal preserved by means of taxidermy

People with the surname
Christian Stuff (born 1982), German footballer

Textile products
Stuff (cloth), a generic term for woven fabrics
Stuffed toy, a children's toy sewn from a textile and filled with soft matter
A clothing line by singer Hilary Duff